The 2004 Porsche Carrera Cup Great Britain was a multi-event, one make motor racing championship held across England, Scotland and Ireland. The championship featured a mix of professional motor racing teams and privately funded drivers, competing in Porsche 911 GT3 cars that conform to the technical regulations for the championship. It forms part of the extensive program of support categories built up around the BTCC centrepiece.

This season was the second Porsche Carrera Cup Great Britain. The season began on 10 April at Thruxton Circuit and concluded on 27 September at Donington Park, after 20 races held at ten meetings, all in support of the 2004 British Touring Car Championship.

Richard Westbrook became the drivers' champion driving for Redline Racing.

Entry List
 All drivers raced in Porsche 911 GT3s.

Calendar & Winners
All races were held in the United Kingdom (excepting Mondello Park round that held in Ireland).

Drivers' Championship

Points were awarded on a 20, 18, 16, 14, 12, 10, 9, 8, 7, 6, 5, 4, 3, 2, 1 basis to the top 15 finishers in each race, with 1 point for the fastest lap in each race and 1 point for pole position in the first race of each meeting.

Bold – Pole
Italics – Fastest Lap

References

Porsche Carrera Cup Great Britain seasons
Porsche Carrera Cup